Holy Cross Church, Binstead is a parish church in the Church of England located in Binstead, Isle of Wight.

History

The 11th and 13th century church is located between the village and the coast. Its location some distance from the modern centre of Binstead probably indicates a medieval village associated with the quarries in the church's vicinity. 

Most of the chancel is of herringbone masonry. The original nave was replaced in 1844 and enlarged in 1875 by the addition of the north aisle. The bellcote dates from 1925 and contains a pre-reformation bell believed to have come from the original, now ruined, Cistercian abbey at Quarr.

On 7 June 1969, the church was seriously damaged by fire. It was restored and rededicated in February 1971. Many stained-glass windows were destroyed and replaced by new designs by Lawrence Lee.

Outside a sheela na gig, locally known as the "Saxon Idol", is carved on a stone gateway to the churchyard which contains several old and interesting burials. Possibly the best known is that of Thomas Sivell who was mistaken for a smuggler by customs officers and shot. His gravestone, with long s replaced with short s where appropriate, reads:
To the memory of THOs SIVELL who was cruelly shot on board his sloop by some officers of customs of the Port of Portsmouth on the 15th June 1785 at the age of 64 years leaving a disconsolate widow & family.
All you that pass pray look and see
How soon my life was took from me
By those officers as you hear
They spilled my Blood that was so dear
But God is Good and just and true
And will reward each to their due
In more recent times Nicholas Dingley, known as Razzle, the drummer of Hanoi Rocks was buried here.

Organ

The church has a pipe organ dating from around 1897 by Hele & Co. A specification of the organ can be found on the National Pipe Organ Register.

References

Church of England church buildings on the Isle of Wight